Rhapsodie espagnole (Spanish Rhapsody), S.254, R.90, is a composition for solo piano composed by Franz Liszt in 1858. The piece is very suggestive of traditional Spanish music, and was inspired by Liszt's tour in Spain and Portugal in 1845. When played, this piece takes roughly 11–14 minutes and contains many extreme technical challenges, including rapid chords and octaves. Ferruccio Busoni arranged the piece for piano and orchestra in 1894.

It includes free variations on La Folia and Jota Aragonesa and opens with a cadenza including blind octaves.

References 
</ref>

External links 
 

Compositions by Franz Liszt
1858 compositions
Compositions for solo piano
Espagnole